Fourth Baptist Church is a historic African-American Baptist church located in Richmond, Virginia.  It was built in 1884, and is a three-story, Greek Revival style stuccoed brick structure.  It features a distyle portico in antis elevated on a high podium.  It consists of two unfluted Doric order columns and paired pilasters supporting a Doric entablature.  Attached to the church is a Sunday School building erected in 1964.

The addition was designed by Ethel Bailey Furman (1893-1976), the first Black woman to practice architecture in the Commonwealth of Virginia.

It was listed on the National Register of Historic Places in 1979.  A former pastor was Richmond mayor Leonidas B. Young, II, who was convicted of defrauding the church at one point during his career.

References

External links
Fourth Baptist Church website

African-American history in Richmond, Virginia
Churches on the National Register of Historic Places in Virginia
Greek Revival church buildings in Virginia
Churches completed in 1884
19th-century Baptist churches in the United States
Baptist churches in Virginia
Churches in Richmond, Virginia
National Register of Historic Places in Richmond, Virginia